Ardie-Ganz was the name of an automobile prototype, built in 1930 by German engineer Josef Ganz at the German motorcycle manufacturer Ardie.

History
In 1930, Ardie President Willy Bendit approved German Jewish engineer Josef Ganz to build a prototype of a small Volkswagen according to his (Ganz's) design. This Ardie-Ganz prototype was finished in September 1930 and achieved highly successful road-test results. The car featured a tubular chassis, mid-mounted engine, and independent wheel suspension with swing-axles at the rear.

The Volkswagen Beetle connection
With the Ardie-Ganz, Adler Maikäfer and Standard Superior cars, as well as his progressive writings and promotion of the concept of a Volkswagen in Motor-Kritik magazine since the 1920s, Josef Ganz is claimed by some to be the inspiration behind the Volkswagen Beetle. Another possible inspiration is the Hanomag 2/10 PS from 1925.

New investigation
While the Volkswagen Beetle was produced in its millions after World War Two, the name of Josef Ganz was largely forgotten. In 2004, Dutch journalist Paul Schilperoord started researching the life and work of Josef Ganz. He has unearthed many new facts, and is currently working on a new book and documentary.
The inspiration for the Volkswagen Beetle came from the Tatra V570, T87, and T97. Tatra sued Ferdinand Porsche for it.

Notes

External links
Joseph Ganz Archive
Joseph Ganz Foundation

Defunct motor vehicle manufacturers of Germany
Volkswagen Beetle